Ilsesee is a lake in Augsburg, Bavaria, Germany. At an elevation of, its surface area is ca. 12 ha.

Lakes of Bavaria